is a Japanese Nordic combined skier who competes internationally.

He competed at the 2018 Winter Olympics.

References

External links

1995 births
Living people
Japanese male Nordic combined skiers
Olympic Nordic combined skiers of Japan
Nordic combined skiers at the 2018 Winter Olympics
Nordic combined skiers at the 2012 Winter Youth Olympics
Competitors at the 2013 Winter Universiade
Competitors at the 2015 Winter Universiade
Competitors at the 2017 Winter Universiade
Universiade medalists in nordic combined
Universiade silver medalists for Japan
Universiade bronze medalists for Japan